Štiavnik is a village and municipality in Bytča District in the Žilina Region of northern Slovakia.

History
In historical records, the village was first mentioned in 1439.

Geography
The municipality lies at an altitude of 387 metres and covers an area of 55.692 km2. It has a population of about 4097 people.

References

External links
http://www.statistics.sk/mosmis/eng/run.html
http://www.stiavnik.sk

Villages and municipalities in Bytča District